Marina di Gioiosa Ionica is a comune (municipality) in the Province of Reggio Calabria in the Italian region Calabria, located about  southwest of Catanzaro and about  northeast of Reggio Calabria.

The municipality of Marina di Gioiosa Ionica contains the frazioni (subdivisions, mainly villages and hamlets) Junchi, Camocelli superiore, Camocelli inferiore and many others.

Marina di Gioiosa Ionica borders the following municipalities: Gioiosa Ionica, Grotteria, Roccella Ionica.

Demographic evolution

References

Cities and towns in Calabria